Webster County is a county in the U.S. state of Nebraska. As of the 2020 United States Census, the population was 3,411. Its county seat is Red Cloud. The county was formed in 1871, and was named for Daniel Webster.

In the Nebraska license plate system, Webster County is represented by the prefix 45 (it had the forty-fifth-largest number of vehicles registered in the county when the license plate system was established in 1922).

Geography
Webster County lies along the south line of Nebraska. Its south boundary line abuts the north boundary line of the state of Kansas. The terrain of Webster County consists of low rolling hills, sloping to the east. The more planar areas of the county are used for agriculture, mostly under center pivot irrigation.

The Republican River flows eastward across the lower part of the county.

Major highways

  U.S. Highway 136
  U.S. Highway 281
  Nebraska Highway 4
  Nebraska Highway 78

Adjacent counties

 Adams County - north
 Clay County - northeast
 Nuckolls County - east
 Jewell County, Kansas - southeast
 Smith County, Kansas - southwest
 Franklin County - west
 Kearney County - northwest

Protected areas
 Indian Creek State Wildlife Management Area
 Liberty Cove Recreation Area

Demographics

As of the 2000 United States Census there were 4,061 people, 1,708 households, and 1,118 families residing in the county. The population density was 7 people per square mile (3/km2). There were 1,972 housing units at an average density of 3 per square mile (1/km2). The racial makeup of the county was 98.10% White, 0.15% Black or African American, 0.27% Native American, 0.47% Asian, 0.07% Pacific Islander, 0.22% from other races, and 0.71% from two or more races.  0.54% of the population were Hispanic or Latino of any race. 50.7% were of German, 9.7% English, 8.3% American and 7.6% Irish ancestry.

There were 1,708 households, out of which 26.80% had children under the age of 18 living with them, 57.70% were married couples living together, 5.00% had a female householder with no husband present, and 34.50% were non-families. 32.60% of all households were made up of individuals, and 17.90% had someone living alone who was 65 years of age or older. The average household size was 2.28 and the average family size was 2.89.

The county population contained 23.60% under the age of 18, 4.60% from 18 to 24, 22.90% from 25 to 44, 24.60% from 45 to 64, and 24.30% who were 65 years of age or older. The median age was 44 years. For every 100 females there were 92.70 males. For every 100 females age 18 and over, there were 91.60 males.

The median income for a household in the county was $30,026, and the median income for a family was $36,513. Males had a median income of $26,555 versus $18,480 for females. The per capita income for the county was $16,802. About 7.70% of families and 11.20% of the population were below the poverty line, including 13.50% of those under age 18 and 10.50% of those age 65 or over.

Communities

Cities
 Blue Hill
 Red Cloud (county seat)

Villages
 Bladen
 Cowles
 Guide Rock

Census-designated place
 Inavale

Unincorporated communities
 Amboy
 Rosemont

Politics
Webster County voters are reliably Republican. In no national election since 1964 has the county selected the Democratic Party candidate (as of 2020).

, county elected officials include:
Commissioners:
District 1: Dan Shipman
District 2: Trevor Karr
District 3: TJ Vance
District 4: Tim Gilbert
District 5: Gary Ratzlaff
Sheriff: Troy Schmitz

See also
 National Register of Historic Places listings in Webster County, Nebraska

References

External links

 

 
1871 establishments in Nebraska
Populated places established in 1871